Isophya harzi is a species of insect in family Tettigoniidae. It is found only in Romania.

References

Sources

Tettigoniidae
Endemic fauna of Romania
Insects described in 1960
Taxonomy articles created by Polbot